Bewani may refer to:
Bewani language, a dialect of Pagi, spoken in Papua New Guinea
Bewani Mountains, mountain range in Papua New Guinea
Bewani River, river in Western New Guinea, Indonesia

See also
Bewani-Wutung Onei Rural LLG, local level government in Sandaun Province, Papua New Guinea